Wendal Peter Wehr (born 27 December 1987 in Worcester, South Africa) is a South African rugby union player for  in the Currie Cup and in the Rugby Challenge. He mostly plays as a flanker, but he has also occasionally played as a winger.

Career

Youth

At youth level, Wehr represented the  side in the 2007 and 2008 editions of the Under-21 Provincial Championship.

Boland Cavaliers

He was more regularly involved during the 2009 Currie Cup Premier Division competition – he was included in the run-on side for ten of their matches during the season and also made a further three appearances off the bench. This was also the season that saw Wehr being employed as a winger instead of his normal position as a flanker, starting three matches of the regular season on the left wing. He scored to help his side to a 36–35 victory in Wellington, but that ultimately proved to futile as a 40–3 victory in the return leg in Witbank saw the  promoted to the Premier Division at the Cavaliers' expense.

Varsity Cup rugby

Wehr left the Cape Winelands to move to Johannesburg, where he joined university side . He played for them in three consecutive Varsity Cup competitions, in 2010, 2011 and 2012. He made sixteen appearances for them during the three seasons, helping them reach the semi-finals of the competition in 2011 and 2012.

Leopards

Club rugby

During his time in North West province, Wehr played his club rugby for Rustenburg Impala. He was a member of their side as they qualified for the first two editions of the SARU Community Cup. He made two appearances in the 2013 SARU Community Cup, scoring one try in their match against Bloemfontein Crusaders as they reached the semi-finals where they lost to eventual winners Despatch. Five appearances followed in the 2014 SARU Community Cup, with Wehr scoring one try in the quarter-finals against Roses United as they went all the way in the competition, becoming champions by beating Roodepoort in the final, with Wehr playing the whole match.

He then returned to his hometown of Worcester, where he played for Villagers Worcester in the 2014 Boland Premier League.

Griquas

During the 2014 Currie Cup Premier Division, Kimberley-based side  announced that they contracted Wehr for the 2015 season.

References

South African rugby union players
Living people
1987 births
Rugby union players from Worcester, South Africa
Rugby union flankers
Rugby union wings
Boland Cavaliers players
Griquas (rugby union) players
Leopards (rugby union) players